Hannah Prock (born 2 February 2000) is an Austrian luger. She competed in the women's singles event at the 2018 Winter Olympics and 2022 Winter Olympics She took her first podium finish in the Luge World Cup in January 2019 when she finished third at a competition at Königssee. She is the daughter of former luger Markus Prock and the cousin of ski jumper Gregor Schlierenzauer.

References

External links
 
 
 Hannah Prock Beijing 2022 Olympics Profile 

2000 births
Living people
Austrian female lugers
Olympic lugers of Austria
Lugers at the 2018 Winter Olympics
Lugers at the 2022 Winter Olympics
Sportspeople from Innsbruck
21st-century Austrian women